Dr. Hasballah M. Saad (July 14, 1948 – August 23, 2011) was an Indonesian politician from the National Mandate Party.

Saad was born in Pidie Regency, Aceh.  He was a State Minister for Human Rights in United Indonesia Cabinet.  At the time of his death Saad was a member of the National Commission for Human Rights and the board secretary for the Indonesian Muslim Intellectuals Association (IMIA).  He died at Bekasi.

References 

1948 births
2011 deaths
Government ministers of Indonesia
National Mandate Party politicians